Jacob H. Gold is an American financial planner, adjunct professor of finance at Arizona State University, and author.

Early life and education
Gold was born in Phoenix, Arizona to Bill Gold and Sharon Gold. He attended Arizona State University where he earned a bachelor's degree in interdisciplinary studies with concentrations in Economics and History. He has since worked as a Certified Financial Planner practitioner.

Career
Gold became the Vice President of Gold & Associates, Inc. in 2000. In 2001, Gold began his own wealth management firm located in Scottsdale, Arizona named Jacob Gold & Associates, Inc. Gold is also an adjunct professor of Personal Financial Management at Arizona State University, in the position of Faculty Associate.

Publications
In 2009, Gold published his first book Financial Intelligence: Getting back to the Basics after an Economic Meltdown.  In 2015, Gold published his second book Money Mindset: Formulating a Wealth Strategy in the 21st Century.

Personal life
Gold has been married to his wife Sara since 2000. They have three children.

References

Living people
Writers from Arizona
Arizona State University alumni
Arizona State University faculty
Businesspeople from Phoenix, Arizona
American financial businesspeople
American financial writers
Financial planners
Year of birth missing (living people)